Mona Hamoudi (born 11 November 1993) is an Iranian footballer who plays as a midfielder for Kowsar Women Football League club Bam Khatoon FC and the Iran women's national team.

International goals
Scores and results list Iran's goal tally first.

References 

1993 births
Living people
Iranian women's footballers
Iran women's international footballers
Women's association football midfielders
People from Ahvaz
Sportspeople from Khuzestan province
21st-century Iranian women